Wabarra is a genus of Australian tangled nest spiders in Queensland first described by V. T. Davies in 1996.  it contains only two species.

References

Amaurobiidae
Araneomorphae genera
Spiders of Australia
Taxa named by Valerie Todd Davies